Kilawin is a Filipino vinegar and meat-based or plant-based preparation method. Kilawin in northern Philippines uses blanched and lightly grilled meat, typically goat meat, beef, carabao, pork, and chicken. It is related to kinilaw but is not eaten raw. They are usually done rare to medium rare, though in some cases the meat are fully cooked. Meat-based kilawin are also traditionally eaten with papaít (literally "bittering agent"), usually bile extracted from the gall bladder or by squishing chewed grass from an animal's stomach. Like kinilaw, the partly cooked meat is prepared fresh and properly cleaned. Like kinilaw, kilawin are usually eaten as appetizers before a meal, or as finger food with alcoholic drinks. Plant-based kilawin has radish, banana flower or green papaya as the main ingredient.

In Ilocos, the Ilocano kilawin kalding or kilawen specifically refers to lightly grilled goat meat kinilaw.  Among the Kapampangan people of Pampanga, quilain (also spelled kilayen or kilayin) or quilain babi refers to kinilaw that use fully cooked pork, heart, liver, and tripe. A similar dish among the Caviteño Tagalogs uses fully boiled pork ears, and is known as kulao or kilawin na tainga ng baboy. When mixed with fried tokwa (tofu) cubes, kulao becomes the more familiar dish tokwa't baboy.  Modern variants of this dish use soy sauce in addition to the other ingredients.

See also 
 Kelaguen - Chamorro dish derived from kilawin
 Kinilaw
 Kulawo
 Paksiw
 Adobo

References 

Philippine seafood dishes
Salads
Philippine meat dishes